USS Cleveland (C-19/PG-33/CL-21) was a United States Navy Denver-class protected cruiser.

Construction
She was launched 28 September 1901 by Bath Iron Works, Bath, Maine, sponsored by "Miss R. Hanna" (probably Ruth Hanna McCormick), and commissioned 2 November 1903, with Commander William Henry Hudson Southerland in command.

Service history
The Cleveland cruised with the European Squadron, in West Indies and Cuban waters, along the east coast between Hampton Roads and Boston, and on a midshipmen training cruise until 17 May 1907. She then sailed from New York via Gibraltar, Port Said, Aden, Colombo and Singapore to Cavite, arriving 1 August 1907.  After three years on the Asiatic station, the Cleveland returned to Mare Island Navy Yard 1 August 1910. Decommissioned 3 August 1910, she was placed in second reserve 8 April 1912, and returned to full commission 31 August 1912.

The Cleveland alternated patrols in waters off Mexico and Central America with reserve periods at Mare Island Navy Yard between 1912 and 1917, protecting American lives and interests from the turmoil of revolution. On 31 March 1917, she arrived at Hampton Roads, and from 9 April to 22 June, patrolled from Cape Hatteras to Charleston. Assigned to escort convoys to a mid-ocean meeting point, the Cleveland made seven voyages between June 1917 and December 1918.

Returning to patrols off Central and South America, the Cleveland was assigned to the Pacific Fleet once more from 16 February 1920, returning to Caribbean waters from time to time. She was reclassified CL-21 on 8 August 1921. During her continued service in the Caribbean and along the South American coasts, the Cleveland made courtesy calls, supported diplomatic activities, gave disaster relief, and represented American interests in troubled areas. She was decommissioned at Boston 1 November 1929, and sold for scrapping 7 March 1930 in accordance with the Washington Naval Treaty limiting naval armament.

References

Bibliography

External links

Protected cruisers of the United States Navy
Denver-class cruisers
Ships built in Bath, Maine
1901 ships
Banana Wars ships of the United States
World War I cruisers of the United States